The Iredell County Courthouse is a historic courthouse building located at Statesville, Iredell County, North Carolina. It was built in 1899, and is a two- to three-story, square Beaux Arts building. It is sheathed in yellow brick and consists of a center five-bay wide three-story block,  topped with a mansard cupola and fronted by a two-story tetrastyle pedimented portico, and flanking one-bay wide two-story wings.

It was listed on the National Register of Historic Places in 1979. It is located in the Statesville Commercial Historic District.

References

Courthouses on the National Register of Historic Places in North Carolina
Beaux-Arts architecture in North Carolina
Government buildings completed in 1899
Buildings and structures in Iredell County, North Carolina
County courthouses in North Carolina
National Register of Historic Places in Iredell County, North Carolina
1899 establishments in North Carolina
Historic district contributing properties in North Carolina